Academic and Professional Background (1982-1992)

After graduating with honors from Georgetown University’s School of Foreign Service and completing his juris doctor degree at Georgetown University Law Center in Washington, D.C., Mr. Rodríguez-Ema returned to Puerto Rico to work as an associate in the corporate and banking division of a major law firm in San Juan. He concentrated and focused his early legal career on the legal aspects of complex financial transactions for the law firm’s banking clients. He was later recruited by Drexel Burnham Lambert-Puerto Rico as a Vice President, later Senior Vice President, of their Corporate and Municipal Finance division. He was responsible for structuring and executing a variety of bond and note issues for the Government of Puerto Rico, its several dependencies, as well as for Drexel’s private clients.  In 1989 Mr. Rodríguez-Ema was recruited by Chase Manhattan Bank in Puerto Rico to manage the investment banking unit of its Chase Securities Puerto Rico subsidiary, thus becoming a member of Chase’s Management Committee in Puerto Rico. After the November 1992 election, the governor-elect of Puerto Rico asked him to join his fiscal and financial team as President of the Government Development Bank for Puerto Rico (GDB). The GDB (www.gdb-pur.com) is the bank and fiscal agent for the government of Puerto Rico. As such, it is chartered with the coordination, structure, execution and placement of every single financing, bond or note issue for all government agencies, government-owned corporations and its multiple dependencies, including all 78 municipalities throughout Puerto Rico.

Solid and Effective Management, Leadership and Decision-Making Skills (1993-1998)

As President of the GDB, Mr. Rodriguez-Ema managed a highly technical and sophisticated 400-employee institution through a 10-member executive committee of senior officers accountable to a Board of Directors that met monthly. He also presided over all the GDB’s subsidiaries (including a housing finance subsidiary and a tourism development subsidiary-Tourism Development Fund). He participated in several high-profile government Boards constantly creating and building consensus among private institutions and public stakeholders for important government-sponsored economic development policies.  He was also Chairman of the Board of Directors of the Economic Development Bank for Puerto Rico (another government-owned financial institution) and Chairman of the government’s Privatization Committee.  As head of the Privatization Committee he was in charge of the implementation of the government’s privatization policy, which entailed the disposition and sale of several major government-owned assets and dependencies, including, the Puerto Rico Telephone Company, the Puerto Rico Maritime Shipping Authority (Navieras) and several government-owned hotel properties, centers for diagnostic treatment and hospitals.  During this time, he was responsible for the promotion, design and financing of the new Museo de Arte de Puerto Rico and the new sports facility Coliseo de Puerto Rico in San Juan, among many other major projects.  He was the first Chairman of the Board of Trustees of the Museo de Arte de Puerto Rico.

Private Sector Management (1999-2009)
	
After leaving government in 1998, Mr. Rodríguez-Ema joined the largest family-owned real estate development company in Puerto Rico as Director of New Business Development. Thus, he undertook the planning and execution of several major projects for the companies, including the purchase of real estate in the mainland for the planned expansion of certain family businesses. As part of the senior advisors to the Chairman he had daily meetings negotiating and building consensus among peers on the several management, operational and legal issues related to development projects, which included the construction, expansion, financing and marketing of shopping centers, office buildings and condominiums; also the purchase, design and development of raw land acquisitions, as well as dealing with the marketing and management of the second largest dairy company and processing operation in Puerto Rico.

Challenging Times Require Skills and Leadership (2009-2012)

In 2009, Mr. Rodríguez-Ema was asked by the newly elected Governor Luis Fortuño to leave the private sector and come join his government as Chief of Staff.  Puerto Rico’s dire economic situation and persistent recession required leaders with strong business and economic background, excellent management and organizational skills who were able to motivate, energize and drive the Governor’s cabinet in the implementation and quick execution of significant and complex fiscal, financial and social policies.  As the Governor’s Chief of Staff, Mr. Rodríguez-Ema was in charge of the immediate supervision of all government agencies (over 120 of them), the organization, drafting and execution of the voluminous and necessary legislation to deal with the economic crisis, the coordination of the state budget (over $28 Billion), as well as actively ushering and lobbying all budgetary and economic crisis legislation through the House and Senate. He was also the Governor’s main spokesperson on all relevant issues as well as liaison with the House Speaker and Senate President.

The government downsizing and the major cuts in contracts and services in order to reduce a staggering $3 Billion deficit and avoid a bond-rating downgrade which could prove catastrophic for the economy were serious and momentous initiatives of historical proportions.

In December 2012 Mr. Rodriguez-Ema formed his own strategic business consulting firm called Proventus, llc, providing clients with valuable insight and business and legal advise into the ever changing and challenging business cycles in Puerto Rico.

References

Living people
Chiefs of Staff of Puerto Rico
Georgetown University Law Center alumni
Presidents of the Puerto Rico Government Development Bank
Year of birth missing (living people)